The 1965 South African Grand Prix was a Formula One motor race held at East London on 1 January 1965. It was race 1 of 10 in both the 1965 World Championship of Drivers and the 1965 International Cup for Formula One Manufacturers. The 85-lap race was won by Lotus driver Jim Clark after he started from pole position. John Surtees finished second for the Ferrari team and BRM driver Graham Hill came in third. This was the World Championship debut race of the future world champion Jackie Stewart.

Race report 

Jim Clark celebrated Hogmanay by dominating the race, leading from pole and breaking the 100 mph barrier, winning by half a minute from Graham Hill and John Surtees and even had time to complete an extra lap after the chequered flag was waved a lap too early. Mike Spence, Bruce McLaren and Championship débutant Jackie Stewart completed the points positions. Goodyear made their Grand Prix début with the Brabham team, challenging the Dunlop monopoly.

Classification

Qualifying

Race

Championship standings after the race

Drivers' Championship standings

Constructors' Championship standings

 Notes: Only the top five positions are included for both sets of standings.

References

South African Grand Prix
Grand Prix
East London, Eastern Cape
South African Grand Prix
South African Grand Prix